George Hamilton Pearce (January 9, 1921 – August 30, 2015) was the first Bishop of the Roman Catholic Diocese of Apia, Samoa, and the first Archbishop of the Roman Catholic Archdiocese of Suva, Fiji.

Born in Boston, Massachusetts, his education included Saint Columbkille's Elementary School in Brighton, Massachusetts, Maryvale Preparatory Seminary in Bedford, Massachusetts, and at Marist College and Seminary in Framingham, Massachusetts. He was ordained to the presbyterate on February 3, 1947, by Archbishop (and future Cardinal) Richard Cushing and was appointed Vicar Apostolic of the Navigators' Archipelago and Titular Bishop of Attalea in Pamphylia on February 29, 1956. He was consecrated to the episcopate on June 29, 1956, in Boston by Cushing.

On June 21, 1966, the Holy See elevated the vicariate apostolic to the dignity of a diocese and Pearce became the first Bishop of Apia. He was appointed as the first Archbishop of Suva, Fiji on June 22, 1967. He retired on April 10, 1976, and lived in Providence, Rhode Island where he led a Marian prayer group at the Cathedral of Saints Peter and Paul. Pearce visited Fatima, Lourdes, and Medjugorje. Pearce died on August 30, 2015, at the age of 94.

References

Sources
 Biography of Msgr. George Hamilton Pearce profile, dioceseofprovidence.org; accessed August 30, 2015.
 Galuega O Le Sinoti (Acts of the Synod of the Archdiocese of Samoa-Apia), December 7–14, 1990, promulgated, May 1, 1991, Feast of Saint Joseph the Worker (Apia, Samoa).

1921 births
2015 deaths
American Roman Catholic archbishops
Clergy from Boston
Clergy from Providence, Rhode Island
Participants in the Second Vatican Council
20th-century Roman Catholic archbishops in Oceania
American expatriates in Fiji
Roman Catholic bishops of Samoa–Apia
Roman Catholic archbishops of Suva
20th-century American Roman Catholic priests